Sandali may refer to:
 Sandali-ye Gav Mishi
 Sandali-ye Kanan